Ribodon is an extinct genus of manatee that lived around South America (Ituzaingó Formation, then described as Entrerriana Formation, Argentina, Solimões Formation, Brazil and Urumaco Formation, Urumaco, Venezuela) during the Tortonian (Mayoan to Huayquerian in the South American land mammal ages). The type species is R. limbatus.

Ribodon is considered the direct ancestor of the Trichechus genus to which all modern manatees belong and was the first manatee to exhibit supernumerary molars that were replaced throughout life, indicating a diet of abrasive plants. Ribodon is hypothesized to have inhabited both coastal and inland freshwater regions; however, in which of the two it originated is unknown.

References 

Prehistoric placental genera
Miocene sirenians
Miocene mammals of South America
Huayquerian
Chasicoan
Mayoan
Neogene Argentina
Fossils of Argentina
Ituzaingó Formation
Neogene Brazil
Fossils of Brazil
Neogene Venezuela
Fossils of Venezuela
Fossil taxa described in 1883
Taxa named by Florentino Ameghino